(born October 12, 1963) is a Japanese musician, better known by the stage name . Dance☆Man calls himself an alien from "Mirror Ball Planet". He is always seen wearing a huge afro wig and sideburns, matched with sunglasses. He is very secretive about his identity to the public, and does not release any personal information in his CDs or his official website.

Fujisawa is currently signed to independent record label In Da Groove, distributed by Nippon Columbia.

Career
Fujisawa went to Dokkyou University, a private college in Saitama prefecture, majoring in economics but eventually dropped out before he could graduate. During his stay in the university, he joined a band called JADOES. The band became official in 1986, when Kadomatsu Toshiki became their record producer. The band's drummer, Yukio Shimamura, did some roadshows with band Casiopea, inspiring Fujisawa to do some roadshows himself.

He started his own career in 1998, calling himself as a space alien from "Planet Mirrorball". He re-arranged famous American/British dance songs from the 70's and 80's, often replacing the lyrics with humorous lines. One of them was Carl Carlton's song "She's a Bad Mama Jama (She's Built, She's Stacked)" He made his own cover version of the song, renamed it to "Se no Takai Yatsu wa Jama", and released it on March 18 under Avex Trax.

In 1999, he began a career in arranging and re-arranging songs written by Japanese composers. He started his career as an arranger to Morning Musume's 7th single, "Love Machine." The single was a success and his name became known in the music industry.

When the millennium came, Fujisawa again arranged another song for the group Morning Musume. "Koi no Dance Site" was the group's 8th single and won an award from 42nd Japanese Japan Record Grand Prix, along with Hiromi Gō's "Nakatta Koto ni Shite." On the same year, Hiromi Gō invited Fujisawa as a guest in his performance at Kōhaku Uta Gassen.

He continued performing and recording songs with a band he called The Bandman, consisted of 8 musicians and back-up vocalists. He is currently working with Konami, writing and arranging songs for the popular video game Beatmania.

His single "Afro Gunsō" became the first ending theme of the anime series Sgt. Frog. He also appeared on the show as a fictional version of himself.

Artists Dance Man worked with

"Disっ娘"(Diskko) (includes members of BeForU)
Spark

Atomic Kitten

Nona Reeves

PaniCrew

Kaci

KinKi Kids

Run&Gun

More Peach Summer Snow

Discography

Albums 
{| class="wikitable" style="text-align:center;"
!#!!Title!!Release date
|-
|1||align="left"|Mirrorballism ~New Generation Dance Classics~||June 24, 1998
|-
|2||align="left"|Mirrorballism 2 ~New Generation Dance Classics~||July 14, 1999
|-
|3||align="left"|Mirrorballism 3 ~New Generation Dance Classics~||November 15, 2000
|-
|4||align="left"|Mirrorballism 4 ~New Generation Dance Classics~||February 27, 2002
|-
|5||align="left"|Greatest Hits||June 19, 2002
|-
|6||align="left"|Funcoverlic||April 14, 2004
|-
|7||align="left"|Funk Love||March 19, 2008
|-
|8||align="left"|Dance☆Man Returns (ダンス☆マン リターンズ)||July 11, 2007
|-
|9||align="left"|Dance☆Man respects Keroro Gunso (ダンス☆マン respects ケロロ軍曹)||February 25, 2009
|-
|10||align="left"|ディスコ戦隊 アフレンジャー"'||July 21, 2010
|}

Singles

DVD
2001-03-07 – Mirrorballismovie''

References

External links
DANCE☆MAN's Official site
Profile at RemyWiki

1963 births
Japanese composers
Japanese dance musicians
Japanese male composers
Living people
Musicians from Tokyo